is an underground railway station on the Minatomirai Line in Naka-ku, Yokohama, Kanagawa Prefecture, Japan operated by the third-sector railway operating company Yokohama Minatomirai Railway.

Lines
Trains through-run to and from the Tokyu Toyoko Line from Shibuya Station and beyond on the Tokyo Metro Fukutoshin Line and Tobu Tojo Line and Seibu Ikebukuro Line.

Station layout

Bashamichi Station is an underground station with a single island platform serving two tracks.

Platforms

History
Bashamichi Station opened on 1 February 2004, coinciding with the opening of the Minatomirai Line.

Passenger statistics
In fiscal 2011, the station was used by an average of 32,446 passengers daily.

Surrounding area
Kanagawa Prefectural Museum of Cultural History
NYK Maritime Museum
Yokohama Red Brick Warehouse

References

External links

  

Naka-ku, Yokohama
Railway stations in Kanagawa Prefecture
Railway stations in Yokohama
Railway stations in Japan opened in 2004